Unlimited Edition can refer to:

 Unlimited Edition, a compilation album by the experimental rock group Can
 Unlimited (Magic: The Gathering), the second Magic: The Gathering set of cards